Absolute Killers, also known as Witness Insecurity and Snitch, is a 2011 American thriller film directed by Heather Hale. The script, based on the self-published novel Insecurity by Eric Troyer, was co-written by Eric Troyer and Heather Hale. Produced by the same duo, the film stars Edward Furlong, Grace Johnston, Rick Ravanello, Brian Krause, Meat Loaf, and Ed Asner. The film had its festival premiere October 1, 2011, under its working title of Witness Insecurity, and theatrical release March 16, 2012, under its original distribution title of Snitch.

Synopsis

The story centers around Johnny Graham (Edward Furlong), who was raised by the Torino crime family after his parents' death. He is constantly bothered by the fact that he has to decide whether he should remain loyal to his adoptive family or to his conscience. It is apparent to Johnny that it is time to act when Anthony Torino (Rick Ravanello) sets his sights on D.A. Elizabeth Jones (Grace Johnston), who is prosecuting Anthony for the gruesome murder of his cousin. Though Johnny is the family accountant, he is an excellent marksman, and he volunteers to make the hit. He persuades a hesitant Anthony to let him eliminate the D.A., when in actuality Johnny only wants to warn her. His plan is ruined by two men from the Torino family sent to oversee his first hit. The ensuing shootout leaves Elizabeth wounded, one of the two overseers dead, and Johnny arrested. Johnny's conscience takes control of him when he confesses and is entered into the Federal Witness Security Program. Shortly afterward, Anthony is apprehended, but he escapes and makes contact with a mole in an attempt to uncover the locations of Johnny and the others who were going to testify against him in trial. Torino family hit-man and Johnny's longtime friend, Vince, comes to the farm where Johnny is hidden. Once again, Johnny is scrambling to keep the lives of those who have crossed paths with Anthony intact, including his own. On his journey, he realizes he is not alone on his mission.

Cast
 Edward Furlong as Johnny
 Grace Johnston as Elizabeth
 Rick Ravanello as Anthony
 Brian Krause as Vince
 Meat Loaf as Dan Sloan (as Meat Loaf Aday)
 Elaine Hendrix as Susan
 Ed Asner as Max
 Rena Owen as Judge Irwin
 P.J. Byrne as Perry
 Daz Crawford as Phil
 Billy Burns as Chuck Thomas
 John Bobek as Matt
 Diana Sayers as Gilda
 Camellia Rahbary as Angela
 Charles Austin Moore II as Julian
 Patrick G. Keenan as Frank
 Brian Gregorie as Wayne
 Donald James Moore as Mike
 Ryan Sawtelle as Detective Regan
 Davis Osborne as Brian

Production

Under its working title of Witness Insecurity, filming began under director Heather Hale in May 2010. Principle filming took place through May and June 2010 in North Carolina, and was subsequently filmed in a number of North Carolina locations, including Charlotte, China Grove, Lexington and Salisbury.

Release
The film premiered as Witness Insecurity on October 1, 2011, at the Modern Film Fest in Kannapolis, North Carolina, with the filmmakers and some of the local actors in attendance for a discussion panel. The film had theatrical release on March 16, 2012, under its distribution title of Snitch.

References

External links
 
 

2011 films
2011 crime thriller films
American crime thriller films
Films shot in North Carolina
2010s English-language films
2010s American films